Lamine Traoré is the name of:

Lamine Traoré (footballer, born 1982), Burkinabé footballer
Lamine Traoré (footballer, born 1991), Guinean footballer
Lamine Traoré (footballer, born 1993), Malian footballer